John F. Kennedy (1917–1963) was the 35th president of the United States from 1961 to 1963.

John F. Kennedy may also refer to:

People
 John F. Kennedy Jr. (1960–1999), son of John F. Kennedy
 John F. Kennedy (Georgia politician) (born 1965), member of the Georgia State Senate
 John Fitzgerald Kennedy, man convicted of the murder of Thomas and Jackie Hawks
 John Francis Kennedy (disambiguation), several people

Transportation-related
J.F. Kennedy, terminal underground station on Line A in Rennes, Brittany, France
JFK/UMass station, station on the MBTA Red Line in Boston, Massachusetts
 John F. Kennedy Boulevard or Kennedy Boulevard may refer to:
 John F. Kennedy Boulevard (Tampa, Florida), a major east–west corridor in Tampa, Florida
 John F. Kennedy Boulevard (Houston, Texas), a major north-south boulevard in Houston, Texas.
 County Route 501 (New Jersey) in Hudson County, New Jersey
 County Route 625 (Cape May County, New Jersey) in Sea Isle City, New Jersey
 A section of westbound Pennsylvania Route 3 in Center City, Philadelphia
 The main thoroughfare in Managua, Nicaragua, which is also known as Carretera Norte.
 John F. Kennedy Boulevard Bridge, which crosses the Schuylkill River in Philadelphia, Pennsylvania
 John F. Kennedy Expressway, a major expressway in Chicago, Illinois
 John F. Kennedy International Airport, New York City, New York, United States
 John F. Kennedy Memorial Airport, Ashland County, Wisconsin, United States
 John F. Kennedy Memorial Bridge, a bridge that crosses the Ohio River between Kentucky and Indiana
 John F. Kennedy Memorial Causeway, a bridge located in Corpus Christi, Texas
 John F. Kennedy Memorial Highway or JFK Memorial Highway may refer to:
 John F. Kennedy Memorial Highway (Maryland), a section of Interstate 95 in Maryland
 Delaware Turnpike, a tolled section of Interstate 95 in Delaware
 Massachusetts Route 18, a continuation of John F. Kennedy Memorial Highway in New Bedford, Massachusetts
 Interstate 25 in Colorado, a section of Interstate 25 in Pueblo County
 MV John F. Kennedy, Staten Island Ferry

Schools
 John F. Kennedy College, Nebraska, United States
 John F. Kennedy High School (disambiguation)
 John F. Kennedy Elementary School (disambiguation)
 John F Kennedy Catholic School, England
 John F. Kennedy Public School, India

Other uses
 , two United States Navy ships
 John Fitzgerald Kennedy National Historic Site, Brookline, Massachusetts
 John F. Kennedy Presidential Library and Museum, Boston, Massachusetts
 John F. Kennedy: Years of Lightning, Day of Drums, a 1966 film
 John F. Kennedy Stadium (disambiguation)
 John F Kennedy (horse), an Irish racehorse
 List of memorials to John F. Kennedy, a list of things named after the president

See also
 John Kennedy (disambiguation)
 JFK (disambiguation)